The 2019 UEC European Track Championships (under-23 & junior) was the 19th continental championships for European under-23 and junior track cyclists, and the 10th since the event was renamed following the reorganisation of European track cycling in 2010. The event took place at the Vlaams Wielercentrum Eddy Merckx in Ghent, Belgium from 9 to 14 July 2019.

Medal summary

Under-23

Junior

Notes
 Competitors named in italics only participated in rounds prior to the final.

Medal table

References

External links
 Results website
 Results Book
 European Cycling Union

under-23
European Track Championships, 2019
European Track
International cycle races hosted by Belgium
UEC European Track Championships (under-23 and junior)